George Roberts (13 February 1914 – 2 August 1943) was a Scotland international rugby union player, who died working on the Burma-Siam Railway at Kanchanaburi in Thailand.

Rugby Union career

Amateur career

He played for Watsonians.

Provincial career

He represented Edinburgh District.

He played for Scotland Possibles in their trial match against Scotland Probables in January 1938, coming on as a substitute in the second half.

International career

See also
 List of Scottish rugby union players killed in World War II

References

Sources

 Bath, Richard (ed.) The Scotland Rugby Miscellany (Vision Sports Publishing Ltd, 2007 )
 Massie, Allan A Portrait of Scottish Rugby (Polygon, Edinburgh)

External links
 Player profile on scrum.com

1914 births
1943 deaths
Scottish rugby union players
Scotland international rugby union players
Watsonians RFC players
Rugby union players from Edinburgh
British Army personnel killed in World War II
Edinburgh District (rugby union) players
Gordon Highlanders officers
Scotland Possibles players
Military personnel from Edinburgh
Rugby union fullbacks